Marvin Akpereogene Paul Edem Ekpiteta (born 26 August 1995) is an English professional footballer who plays as a defender for EFL Championship club Blackpool. He has previously played for Chelmsford City, Witham Town, Concord Rangers, East Thurrock United and Leyton Orient.

Club career
In 2014, Ekpiteta began his senior career at Chelmsford City, following a spell in the youth set-up at Oxford United. In January 2015, Ekpiteta signed dual-registration forms with Witham Town. After making 58 league appearances for Chelmsford, scoring three times, Ekpiteta signed for Essex rivals Concord Rangers in 2016. In January 2017, after making 22 National League South appearances for the club, Ekpiteta signed for East Thurrock United, in a move labelled as "naïve" by Concord manager Adam Flanagan.

On 31 January 2018, Ekpiteta signed for National League club Leyton Orient on a -year contract, being loaned back to East Thurrock as part of the deal. After three games back on loan at East Thurrock, Ekpiteta was recalled from the club, making his Leyton Orient debut in a 1–0 loss away to Dover Athletic on 3 March 2018. On 9 March 2019, Ekpiteta scored the winner for Leyton Orient in a 1–0 win against Wrexham, which saw Orient replace Wrexham at the top of the National League. At the end of the season, Leyton Orient gained promotion, with Ekpiteta making his Football League debut on 3 August 2019 in a 1–0 win against Cheltenham Town.

Ekpiteta signed a two-year contract with Blackpool on 8 July 2020. He scored his first goal for Blackpool in a 5–0 win over Wigan Athletic on 27 January 2021. He signed another two-year contract with the club on 8 March 2022. Ekpiteta was named Blackpool's player of the season for the 2021–22 season by both the club supporters and his teammates.

International career
In 2013, Ekpiteta was called up for Nigeria U20, making two appearances. On 10 October 2018, Ekpiteta made his debut for England C in a 1–0 victory against Estonia U23.

Personal life
Ekpiteta's brother, Marvel, also played professional football.

In May 2022, Ekpiteta's Blackpool teammate Jake Daniels came out as gay. Following his announcement, some of Ekpiteta social media posts dating back to 2012 and 2013 were highlighted as being homophobic. Ekpiteta responded by deleting the posts and issuing an apology, saying that his actions from a decade prior "do not in any way reflect the values [he] hold[s] now". In response, Daniels accepted the apology, and tweeted that he is "proud" of being Ekpiteta's teammate. On 30 May, the Football Association issued Ekpiteta a formal warning for his tweets.

Career statistics

Honours
Leyton Orient
National League: 2018–19
FA Trophy runner-up: 2018–19
Individual

 Blackpool Player of the Season: 2021–22

References

External links

Living people
1995 births
Black British sportsmen
Footballers from Enfield, London
English footballers
English people of Nigerian descent
Nigerian footballers
Association football defenders
Leyton Orient F.C. players
Concord Rangers F.C. players
Chelmsford City F.C. players
East Thurrock United F.C. players
Blackpool F.C. players
Nigeria youth international footballers
English Football League players
England semi-pro international footballers
National League (English football) players
Witham Town F.C. players